Soltanabad (also Romanized as Solţānābād) is a village in Chaghakhor Rural District, Boldaji District, Borujen County, Chaharmahal and Bakhtiari Province, Iran. At the 2006 census, its population was 97, in 28 families. The village is populated by Lurs.

References 

Populated places in Borujen County
Luri settlements in Chaharmahal and Bakhtiari Province